B64 may refer to:

 B64 (New York City bus), a bus route in Brooklyn, New York City
 Base64, an encoding scheme
 Design B-65 cruiser, a class of Super Type A cruisers planned by the Imperial Japanese Navy
Sicilian, Richter-Rauzer variation in chess (code B64)

See also
 Bomberman 64 (disambiguation)